Markus Aarni Erämies Kajo (born 7 December 1957 in Isojoki) is a Finnish reporter, screenwriter and TV show host. He has appeared on YLE TV2 in shows such as Ihmisen käsikirja, Markus Kajon ruudunsäästöohjelma, Naurun paikka and TV-ohjelma Kettunen.

Kajo's trademark laid-back, witty yet extremely dry style made a breakthrough in the show Kettunen which he did together with Hannu Lumivuori, where Kajo appeared as the main character, wondering about different society phenomena, spliced together with old magazine advertisements and TV archive clips, and making calm, quiet jokes about them. Kajo's ponderings in the show have later been published as books. The Naurun paikka show showed comical foreign home videos. It was awarded the public Venla award in 1995 and the Telvis award in 1997.

At one time, the Trabant Express show mocked Kajo, and Kajo didn't like this, so in his own show, he suggested that those who mocked him should be sent to the army to dig up mines in a winter temperature of -30 °C (-22 °F).

In summer 2006, Markus Kajo investigated the wonders and specialities of Japan in a 9-part show called Nousevan auringon Kajo.

Bibliography
 Kettusen kirja (WSOY, 1989)
 Kettusen toinen tuleminen (WSOY, 1991)
 Kettusen kirja (WSOY, 1992) - audio book
 Kettusen päästöt eli Toisinajattelijain satuja (WSOY, 1993) - audio book
 Kettusen kolmas (WSOY, 1995)
 Kettusen kootut (WSOY, 1996)
 Kettusen paluu: Ihmisen käsikirja (WSOY, 2003)

External links
 Official homepage of Markus Kajo
 City library of Tampere - modern writers from Pirkanmaa: Markus Kajo

1957 births
Finnish journalists
Finnish writers
Living people